2 Autumns, 3 Winters is a 2013 French film written and directed by Sébastien Betbeder.

Plot
The story is narrated by each of the major characters. At the beginning, 33-year-old Arman (Macaigne) decides to change his life. For starters, he takes up jogging, which is how he has his first meeting with Amélie (Wyler).

Cast
 Vincent Macaigne as Arman
 Maud Wyler as Amélie
 Bastien Bouillon as Benjamin
 Audrey Bastien as Katia
 Thomas Blanchard as Jan
 Pauline Etienne as Lucie
  as Arman's father
  as Guillaume
  as Hazuki
 Loïc Hourcastagnon as the small ninja
 Emmanuel Demonsant as the big ninja
 Philippe Crespeau as Benjamin's father
 Marie-Claude Roulin as Benjamin's mother
 as the skater
 Jérôme Thibault as the doctor

Release
The Marchers had theatrical showings in North America as part of the Rendez-vous with French Cinema series 2014 program.

Critical response
Jordan Mintzer of The Hollywood Reporter called it a "low-key kind of dramedy" and a "quirky French indie that gets by more on style and sass than on its storytelling skills, [...] With endearing performances and crafty 16mm imagery, but also a tad too many winks to the camera, this Cannes ACID sidebar selection should see additional fest and niche art-house play".

Ronnie Scheib of Variety commented that "[i]n Sebastien Betbeder's playfully arty 2 Autumns, 3 Winters, three protagonists offer self-conscious riffs on their every thought and action, directly addressing the camera to describe past happenings, present happenings or what's about to occur momentarily. Mundane actions, trite exchanges and life-altering events all undergo the same literary alchemy, creating a matter-of-fact, Woody Allen-ish sense of complicity with the viewer. Maintaining a bemused, sometimes comic distance, Betbeder traces how happenstance crystallizes into biography as his characters traverse the titular seasons, with results that will delight some and alienate others."

Mike Russell of The Oregonian gave it a 'B' grade saying "[a] fair amount of traumatic stuff happens in 2 Autumns, 3 Winters [... b]ut writer/director Sébastien Betbeder's French seriocomic romance still feels light (or emotionally distant, depending), thanks to the film's fusillade of stylistic tics."

References

External links
 
 
 
 2 Autumns, 3 Winters at Allocine
  (with English subtitles)

2013 films
2013 romantic comedy films
French romantic comedy films
2010s French-language films
Films set in Paris
Films set in the 2010s
Films shot in France
2010s French films